Galangue is a town and commune of Angola, located in the province of Huíla.

American doctor Aaron Manasses McMillan served as a medical missionary to Galangue from 1931 to 1948.

See also 

 Communes of Angola

References 

Populated places in Huíla Province